The Terwilleger Creek flows into the Mohawk River in Cranesville.

References 

Rivers of New York (state)
Rivers of Montgomery County, New York
Mohawk River